Capoeta capoeta is a species of West Asian cyprinid fish, including forms called the Caucasian scraper. The scientific name is derived from the Georgian and Azeri local name kapwaeti.

Some taxonomic authorities classify Capoeta sevangi as a subspecies.

Sources 

Capoeta
Fish described in 1773
Taxa named by Johann Anton Güldenstädt